Shaka Sankofa (born Gary Lee Graham; September 5, 1963 – June 22, 2000) was a Texas death-row inmate who was sentenced to death at the age of 17 for the murder of 53-year-old Bobby Grant Lambert in Houston, Texas, on May 13, 1981. He was executed by lethal injection on June 22, 2000 in Huntsville, Texas.

Lambert's murder occurred at night in the parking lot of a Safeway supermarket. Although Sankofa denied committing the murder, he admitted that at the time of Lambert's death he was on a week-long spree of armed robberies, assaults, attempted murders and one rape. He was captured after a 57-year-old woman he had kidnapped, raped and tortured gained control of his gun and held it on him. She then called police.

Sankofa maintained his innocence of Lambert's murder from the time of his arrest and throughout the nineteen years he spent on death row. He pleaded guilty to armed robbery charges.

Sankofa's supporters, including Coretta Scott King, bishop Desmond Tutu, Al Sharpton, Jesse Jackson, and celebrities Danny Glover, Kenny Rogers, Lionel Richie, Harry Belafonte and Ruby Dee, brought his case international attention, arguing that his conviction was based on the testimony of a single eyewitness who said she saw him for a few seconds in the dark parking lot committing the murder.
The witness contradicts this claim, stating she saw his face three times over the course of two to three minutes as she followed him from the crime scene. She was one of 19 witnesses to identify Graham during a crime spree which included 20 armed robberies, 3 kidnappings, 1 rape, and 3 attempted murders in addition to the Lambert murder.

The jury did not hear testimony from a few other apparent eyewitnesses who believed that Sankofa was not the killer because they believed he was too short to be the killer. They did not see his face. No other suspects were questioned and there was a lack of physical evidence. Supporters also argued that there was other crucial evidence the jury did not hear and that he had poor legal representation at the time of his trial.

At the time of his execution, Sankofa became the 23rd inmate executed in Texas during 2000 and the 222nd person to be executed in Texas since capital punishment was resumed there in 1982.

Childhood 

Gary Lee Graham was born to Thelma Griffin and Willie Graham. A high school dropout, Sankofa was illiterate at the time of his arrest. Growing out of control as a teen, his negative behavior began with nonviolent petty offenses, starting on May 14, 1981.  

On May 20, he was arrested for his first major felony: the series of ten armed robberies and aggravated assaults during his week-long spree of crime, including the rape of 57-year-old taxi driver Lisa Blackburn, to which he pleaded guilty and faced 20-year prison sentences.  On May 27, however, witness Bernadine Skillern identified Sankofa as Bobby Grant Lambert's murderer, and on November 9, at age 18, Sankofa was on death row for the murder of Lambert.

Prison 

Sankofa entered the Texas Department of Criminal Justice (TDCJ) as inmate #696 on November 9, 1981. Sankofa was initially located in the Ellis Unit, but was transferred to the Allan B. Polunsky Unit (formerly the Terrell Unit) in 1999.

In prison, Sankofa learned to read and write, earning his GED and paralegal certification. From the day of his arrest, he acknowledged portions of his week-long crime spree. For these crimes, he had served almost two decades in prison, apologizing verbally and in writing to the victims of these crimes and asked young people to turn their backs on criminal conduct. He became an activist and, in 1995, changed his name from Gary Lee Graham to Shaka Sankofa. The name "Shaka" was chosen in honor of the South African warrior Shaka Zulu.

Sankofa was scheduled to be executed five times: once in 1987, three times in 1993 (April, in which Lambert's widow Loretta appealed to Governor Ann Richards to spare Sankofa's life; May and August), and once on January 11, 1999, and each time he was given a stay of execution before it was lifted.

Execution 
After the appeals had failed, Sankofa resisted when the time came for him to be taken to the death chamber. A Cell Extraction Team was dispatched to force him towards the death chamber, where it took five jail guards to strap him to the gurney.

Witnesses to the execution on Sankofa's behalf included his stepmother Elnora Graham, his spiritual advisor, Nation of Islam Minister Robert Muhammad, Bianca Jagger, Rev. Jesse Jackson and Rev. Al Sharpton.

Sankofa released a final statement in which he again asserted his innocence and denounced the government.

Funeral and memorial service 
More than 2000 people attended Sankofa's wake on June 28, 2000 and his funeral the following day. He was buried at Paradise North Cemetery in Houston in a gold-colored casket, wearing a turquoise and gold African garment.
Ross Mortuary in Houston's 5th Ward had his body.

Family 

Sankofa was survived by his daughter and son, Deidra Hawkins and Gary Lee Hawkins, aged 19 and 20, respectively, at the time of their father's execution. He was also survived by his granddaughter, stepmother, paternal grandmother, sister, stepsister, and three brothers.

His son was arrested at the age of 20 for the murder of 32-year-old Melvin Pope, on March 28, 2000, about three months before his father's execution. On March 27, 2001, he was convicted of the murder and sentenced to life in prison. He maintains his innocence.

See also
 Capital punishment for juveniles in the United States
 Capital punishment in Texas
 Capital punishment in the United States
 List of people executed in Texas, 2000–2009
 List of people executed in the United States in 2000
 Roper v. Simmons: 2005 U.S. Supreme Court ruling that the execution of those under 18 (at the time of committing the capital crime) is unconstitutional.
 Thompson v. Oklahoma: 1988 U.S. Supreme Court ruling that the execution of those who committed their crime when under the age of 16 is unconstitutional.

References

External links
 CNN - Graham Case Before Texas Board As Clock Ticks Towards Execution (includes video and audio files)
 CNN - Texas Parole Board Considers Fate of Condemned Man (includes video and audio links)
 Greta Van Susteren talks to Shaka Sankofa, and Discussion: Transcript (aired June 9, 2000)
 Gary Lee Graham at the Office of the Clark County Prosecuting Attorney

1963 births
2000 deaths
American people convicted of murder
Criminals from Texas
People executed for murder
20th-century executions by Texas
People executed by Texas by lethal injection
Place of birth missing
People convicted of murder by Texas
Executed African-American people
Juvenile offenders executed by the United States
20th-century executions of American people